Crashing Thru is a 1949 American western film directed by Ray Taylor and written by Adele Buffington. The film stars Whip Wilson, Andy Clyde, Christine Larson, Tris Coffin, Steve Darrell and George J. Lewis. The film was released on January 9, 1949, by Monogram Pictures.

Plot

Cast          
Whip Wilson as Whip Wilson
Andy Clyde as Winks Winkle
Christine Larson as Stella Drew
Tris Coffin as Cliff Devin
Steve Darrell as John Mason
George J. Lewis as Jarvis 
Jan Bryant as Janet Raymond
Kenne Duncan as Tim Raymond
Virginia Carroll as Mrs. Grey
Tom Quinn as Bartender Gus
Dee Cooper as Bill
Jack Richardson as Baker

References

External links
 

1949 films
1940s English-language films
American Western (genre) films
1949 Western (genre) films
Monogram Pictures films
Films directed by Ray Taylor
American black-and-white films
1940s American films